101 Tower is a skyscraper in Kyiv, Ukraine. The 27 storey building was completed in 2012. In 2022 Russian invasion of Ukraine the building received a serious damage in October airstrikes by Russian army, currently the building is closed waiting for reconstruction. 

The land under the property was being rented by the Eurozhitlogrup Company which is owned by Сур Rose Holding Limited based in Cyprus. In March 2020, it was announced that Сур Rose Holding Limited was being bought by Dragon Capital Investments Limited, also bought in Cyprus. It was reported that one of the beneficiaries of Eurozhytlogrup is Stepan Chernovetskyi, a son of the former mayor of Kyiv, Leonid Chernovetskyi. The building houses the headquarters of Samsung  in Ukraine.

History
The business center's construction April 2009. The original project was 34 floors tall but in 2010 KAN Development asked Ministry of Regional Development and Construction to approve an updated 27 floor project. The construction was finished in May 2012

In January 2016 the GreenFuel W32A charge station was opened in the 101 Tower parking, therefore making it the first office building in Ukraine with its own EV charger.

When Russia invaded Ukraine in 2022 the building was badly damaged in an October missile attack. Owner of the KAN Development Igor Nikonov said that nobody got hurt because the strike took place early in the morning and if it was to happen a couple hours later the result would've been different The renovation will cost at least ten million dollars, but owners are still calculating the final cost so the repair work hasn't been started yet.

Accidents
25 June 2012 the balcony at the seventh floor of the building had caught fire due to short circuit in the fitness center. Firefighters arrived in 8 minutes and extinguished the fire in 15 minutes. Nobody got hurt, but fire destroyed the insulation.

During 2022 Russian invasion of Ukraine the building suffered severe damage in Russian air strikes in October. 10 October Russian rocket fell behind the business center and the impact of its explosion seriously damaged building's facade, nobody got hurt inside the building.

See also
List of tallest buildings in Ukraine

References

Buildings and structures in Kyiv
Skyscrapers in Ukraine
Commercial buildings completed in 2012